The Battle of Suriname or Battle of Surinam was a battle between the Netherlands and the United Kingdom for the control of the Suriname colony.

Capture
The colony, which was held by a Dutch garrison, was captured on 5 May 1804 by a British squadron of 31 ships carrying 500 soldiers under the command of Samuel Hood and Sir Charles Green. Following the capture, Green was made governor general of British Suriname. Shrapnel shells were used for the first at the battle, after their creation by Major Henry Shrapnel in Newfoundland.

Order of battle

Royal Navy

References
George Bruce. Harbottle's Dictionary of Battles. (Van Nostrand Reinhold, 1981).

Specific

Suriname
Suriname
History of Suriname
Suriname
Netherlands–United Kingdom relations
Suriname
May 1804 events